Tritonia newfoundlandica is a species of dendronotid nudibranch. It is a marine gastropod mollusc in the family Tritoniidae.

Distribution
This species was found off Flemish Cap, west of Newfoundland at 538–492 m depth, .

References

Tritoniidae
Gastropods described in 2017